The National Reform Party of Belize was a Belizean, Christian conservative political party seeking office during the 2008 Belizean general election under the following guiding principles. It failed to win any seats and has not contested any elections since.

Hope:
Eradicate poverty and depression

Integrity:
Preventing corruption by removing dishonest Leadership

Justice:
Morality and respect of Law and stop abuse, victimization and breach of contracts

Reform:
Restructure and upgrade governance to prevent corrosion in democracy

Progress:
Stabilizing the economy and proper use of public funds

The party's colors are orange and white. The party's emblem is a fist enclosed by a circle, which stands for a combination of "power, security, value and justice... unity, inclusiveness and togetherness." The Party Leader is business man Cornelius Dueck.

February 21 press conference 
The NRP held a press conference on February 21, 2007 at its headquarters on the Northern Highway to present its candidates and platform.

Party Leader and candidate for Cayo Northeast, Cornelius Dueck, told listeners that neither the ruling People's United Party nor the Opposition United Democratic Party (Belize) have anything to offer Belizeans. He declared his party's platform to be anti-corruption, pro-development and social upliftment. The NRP promised transparency and upfrontness about campaign financing.

Nominated candidates 
 Party Leader Cornelius Dueck, Cayo Northeast
 Belize Rural South, Ernesto Caliz
 Cayo Central, George Boiton Jr.
 Cayo North, Alden McDougal
 Orange Walk South, Enio Lopez
 Orange Walk North, Hilberto Nah
 Orange Walk Central, Alvaro Espejo
 Orange Walk East, Pavel Torres
 Toledo West, Fermin Choc
 Lake Independence, Gary Lambey

Party officials 
 Leader, Cornelius Dueck
 National Campaign Coordinator, Esteban Bejerano
 Planning Unit Coordinator, German Cob
 Advisors: George Dueck, Abraham Braun, Emiliano Lozano

References 

Channel 5. "New political party will soon be unveiled." June 5, 2006. 

Channel 5. "New party long on heart, short on facts." June 21, 2006. 

Channel 5.  "Third party? NRP makes it five." February 21, 2007

Channel 7.  National Reform Party puts God first at launch. February 21, 2007

External links 
 National Reform Party of Belize information website

Political parties established in 2006
Defunct political parties in Belize
2006 establishments in Belize
Conservative parties in North America